Regina Ashford Barrow is an American politician serving as a member of the Louisiana State Senate from the 15th district. Elected in November 2015, she assumed office on January 11, 2016. Barrow previously represented the 29th district in the Louisiana House of Representatives from 2005 to 2016.

Early life and education 
Barrow was born in Wilkinson County, Mississippi and raised in Baton Rouge, Louisiana. She earned an associate degree in accounting from the Baton Rouge School of Computers and attended Southern University.

Career 
From 1998 to 2005, Barrow was the executive director of Rise Up Louisiana. She then served as a legislative assistant for Sharon Weston Broome. She was a member of the Louisiana House of Representatives from 2005 to 2016, after which she was elected to the Louisiana State Senate. Since 2019, she has also served as vice chair of the Senate Health & Welfare Committee. As vice chair, Barrow authored a measure that requires female prisoners in Louisiana state prisons to have access to feminine hygiene products. She has also worked to pass restrictive abortion laws in the state.

References 

Living people
People from Wilkinson County, Mississippi
People from Baton Rouge, Louisiana
Politicians from Baton Rouge, Louisiana
African-American state legislators in Louisiana
Women state legislators in Louisiana
Democratic Party members of the Louisiana House of Representatives
Democratic Party Louisiana state senators
Year of birth missing (living people)
21st-century African-American people
21st-century African-American women